"Honk Your Horn" is a song by American recording artist, Dani Stevenson. The song features production and guest vocals by Missy Elliott. It was released on September 17, 2002, as the lead single for Stevenson's debut album, Is There Another?!. Although the single was released in 2002, it did not chart on Billboard until October 2003.

Track listings and formats
EP version
 "Honk Your Horn" (featuring Missy Elliott) (Radio Edit) – 3:18
 "Yo, Yo, Yo" (Snippet) – 1:07
 "Bogus" (Snippet) – 1:02
 "It's Like a Jungle" (Snippet) – 1:02
 "Indecent Proposal" (What Would You Do?) (Snippet) – 1:06

CD single
 "Radio Edit" – 3:32
 "Radio Edit w/out Rap" – 3:05
 "Instrumental" – 3:44

Chart performance

References

2002 singles
2002 songs
Missy Elliott songs
Songs written by Missy Elliott
Universal Motown Records singles
Neo soul songs